Villeneuve-lès-Avignon (Provençal: Vilanòva d’Avinhon) is a commune in the Gard department in southern France. It can also be spelled Villeneuve-lez-Avignon.

History
In the 6th century the Benedictine abbey of St André was founded on Mount Andaon, and the village which grew up round it took its name. The city itself was founded by Philippe le Bel and boasts a castle he built, Fort Saint-André.

The town was also the resort of the French cardinals during the sojourn of the popes at Avignon, in the 14th century.

Geography
It is located on the right (western) bank of the river Rhône, opposite Avignon.

Population

Sights
 Fort Saint-André, on a hill outside the town
 Tour Philippe Le Bel, 14th century
 The church of Notre Dame, dating from the 14th century, contains a rich marble altar and significant pictures.
 Carthusian monastery Notre-Dame-du-Val-de-Bénédiction, founded in 1356 by Pope Innocent VI

International relations

Villeneuve-lès-Avignon is twinned with:
  Rheinbach, Germany
  Gytheio, Greece
  San Miniato, Italy

Gallery

See also
 Communes of the Gard department
 Pont d'Avignon

References

Further reading

External links

 City council and Tourist office website
 non official website citeroyale.com
 Pictures Gallery

Communes of Gard